Győző Szabó (born 7 July 1970) is a Hungarian actor. He appeared in more than sixty films since 1994.

Selected filmography

References

External links 

1970 births
Living people
Hungarian male film actors